Torre MAPFRE (MAPFRE Tower) is a 124-meter, 27-story office building at Paseo de la Reforma 243 in Mexico City, at the Glorieta de la Palma ("palm" roundabout) at the intersection of Río Rhin avenue in the Colonia Cuauhtémoc neighborhood. It is the tenth tallest tower on the emblematic boulevard.

Tenants 
Source: Google Maps
 Aeroméxico headquarters
 Investabank
 Halliburton
 Banco Ve Por Más
 Beiersdorf
 Dow
 Sports World gym
 IOS Offices
 Embassy of Japan

References 

Airline headquarters
Skyscrapers in Mexico City
Cuauhtémoc, Mexico City
Aeroméxico
Paseo de la Reforma